Alpine style is mountaineering in a self-sufficient manner, thereby carrying all of one's food, shelter and equipment as one climbs, as opposed to expedition style (or siege style) mountaineering which involves setting up a fixed line of stocked camps on the mountain which can be accessed at one's leisure. Additionally, alpine style climbing means the refusal of fixed ropes, mountain guides, high-altitude porters, supplemental oxygen and doping agents, and portable hyperbaric bags.

Rise in popularity
Many consider alpine style to be the most aesthetically "pure" form of mountaineering, setting a standard to which all mountaineers should aspire. This style became well-known and popular with Reinhold Messner, when he and Peter Habeler climbed Gasherbrum I (K5) without oxygen equipment in 1975. Earlier, Wojciech Kurtyka began alpine-style climbing at high altitudes (1972 - Akher Tsagh (7017 m) and Kohe Tez (7015 m)). It was Hermann Buhl's idea to demonstrate alpine style in the Karakoram at the successful Austrian Broad Peak expedition in 1957; in pure alpine style the members of this expedition later climbed Skil Brum (Marcus Schmuck and Fritz Wintersteller) and approached Chogolisa (Hermann Buhl and Kurt Diemberger). A particular increase in popularity has occurred since the creation of the Golden Ice Axe award, one of the main requirements of which is the use of the alpine style.

Benefits
The benefits of alpine style include spending much less time on the route, thereby reducing objective dangers such as avalanches or blizzards. This can be a major factor on routes with ice fields full of blocks of ice hundreds of feet tall which could fall at any time. Snow and icy conditions often change over the course of a day forcing climbing parties to climb in the early hours before the sun melts the snow or ice making it unsuitable and more susceptible to avalanche. This tendency to climb in the morning has led to the term "Alpine Start". An "Alpine Start" is an early start that ranges from starting at 11:00pm of the night before on long routes, to not long before sunrise for shorter routes or faster parties. An "Alpine Start" must begin in the dark.

Challenges
The problems encountered while alpine style climbing are related to lack of support and potentially the lack of acclimatization associated with spending less time at very high altitudes. Without fixed ropes to retreat down in case of emergency, or a lower camp to return to, the commitment of alpine style is greater than expedition style in terms of the choice to ascend or descend. A climbing group caught at a point where conditions do not allow further ascent must consider other options such as an unplanned bivouac (perhaps without the appropriate gear), rappels (leaving multiple pieces of protection behind), or moving to another route from their current position (perhaps without adequate knowledge of an alternative route). However, alpine style often is cheaper and faster for those on a budget, as alpine style climbing typically involves less equipment, and eliminates the need to hire porters.

See also
Piolet d'Or

References

Types of climbing
Types of Mountaineering